Dicellostyles axillaris is a species of flowering plant in the family Malvaceae endemic to Sri Lanka. It is the only species in the genus Dicellostyles.

References

Hibisceae
Endemic flora of Sri Lanka
Critically endangered plants
Monotypic Malvales genera
Malvaceae genera
Taxonomy articles created by Polbot